) is an extensive neighborhood of Barcelona (Sant Martí district) that borders the Mediterranean Sea to the south, Sant Adrià del Besòs to the east, Parc de la Ciutadella in  Ciutat Vella to the west, and Sant Andreu to the north. In the past the neighborhood was a town entirely separated from Barcelona.

History
During the Industrial Revolution of the 19th century, Poblenou was the epicenter of Catalan and Iberian industry, earning it its sobriquet of the Catalan Manchester. Surrounding the extensive cluster of factories stood mostly working class residential areas. When the industrial buzz passed, the neighborhood fell into a state of abandon and after a period of decay, the neighborhood underwent a dramatic transformation. The Olympic Games in 1992 were the main trigger for this massive transformation of El Poblenou. Many of the areas that have been developed — including the Vila Olímpica, the Diagonal Mar area, and the Fòrum area — arguably comprise their own neighborhoods. Completing its original, unfinished plan, The Avinguda Diagonal now stretches from Plaça de les Glòries to the sea. The massive 22@ plan sets to convert Poblenou into the city's technological and innovation district, as well as to increase leisure and residential spaces.

Alongside the newly built, upscale Vila Olímpica and Diagonal Mar areas, many artists and young professionals have converted the former factories and warehouses into lofts, galleries, and shops. Art & Design schools and studios have also opened, making the area known for its creative outlook.

Some of the old factory buildings are now declared historic monuments and are under protection. This is the case of the Factory Hispania SA, built by the Cuban-German merchant Emilio Heydrich, and architect Josep Graner in 1923, or the factory of chemicals "Valls, Teixidor i Jordana"

The leafy Rambla del Poblenou, which stretches from Avinguda Diagonal to the beach, is the main commercial street.

Life in El Poblenou
El Poblenou lies between the great beaches of Barcelona and city center which allow its residents on the one hand a great chilled beach lifestyle and, on the other hand, proximity to a huge variety of shopping centers, bars and restaurants. Due to its rising popularity, prices of flats in the area have increased dramatically. Besides good beaches this neighborhood offers wide open spaces, green parks and relatively few tourists.

The annual light art festival Llum BCN is celebrated since 2012 every February in Poblenou.

Landmarks
Notable buildings of Poblenou include the Torre Agbar (Jean Nouvel), Herzog & de Meuron's Forum Building (which houses Europe's largest scale model of a city), and the ME Barcelona Hotel (former Habitat Sky Hotel) (Dominique Perrault). Major public spaces include the Parc de Diagonal Mar (Enric Miralles), the Plaça de les Glòries Catalanes, the Parc Central del Poblenou (Jean Nouvel), the beachfront Parc del Poblenou, the vast Parc del Forum, Oficines Diagonal 197 (David Chipperfield), the Media-Tic Building (Enric Ruiz Geli - CLOUD 9) (the historic Poblenou Cemetery as well as many kilometres of beaches.

Public transport
Barcelona Metro line 1 stations: Marina, Glòries
Barcelona Metro line 4 stations: Selva de Mar, Poblenou, Llacuna, Bogatell
Trambesòs stations: Glòries, Ca l'Aranyó, Pere IV, Fluvià

See also
Primavera Sound Festival
2004 Universal Forum of Cultures

References

External links

 Online tour of Poblenou from the City's web
 Website of 22@ 'The Innovation District'
 Poblenou neighbourhood association
 Information on the Parc Central del Poblenou
 Sant Martí council

 
Sant Martí (district)